The Diocese of Mara is a diocese in the Anglican Church of Tanzania: its current bishop is the Right Reverend George Okoth.

Notes

Anglican Church of Tanzania dioceses
Anglican bishops of Mara
Mara Region
Anglican realignment dioceses